"Donna Lee" is a 1947 bebop jazz standard recorded by the Charlie Parker Quintet.

Donna Lee may also refer to:

 Donna Lee (album), 1972 album by Anthony Braxton
 Donna Lee (field hockey) (born 1960), American field hockey player
 Donna Lee Bakery murders, 1974 mass murder in New Britain, Connecticut